Abarj Rural District is a rural district (dehestan) in Dorudzan District, Marvdasht County, Fars Province, Iran. At the 2006 census, its population was 11,904, in 2,574 families.  The rural district has 29 villages.

References 

Rural Districts of Fars Province
Marvdasht County